Sétna or Sedna was the name of two legendary High Kings of Ireland: 

Sétna Airt, son of Artrí, son of Éber, son of Ír, son of Míl Espáine
Sétna Innarraid, son of Bres Rí

See also
Renu Setna, British actor
Sethna
Sedna (disambiguation)